Caerau railway station served the village of Caerau, in the historical county of Glamorgan, Wales, from 1901 to 1970 on the Llynvi and Ogmore Railway.

History 
The station was opened on 1 April 1901 by the Great Western Railway. It was a request stop. The route was cut back from Cymmer in June 1960 and the station closed to the public on 22 June 1970. It was used by schools until 15 July 1970.

References

External links 

Disused railway stations in Bridgend County Borough
Railway stations in Great Britain opened in 1901
Railway stations in Great Britain closed in 1970
Beeching closures in Wales
Former Great Western Railway stations
1901 establishments in Wales
1970 disestablishments in Wales